Technology Professionals Canada (TPC) is an organization in Regina, Saskatchewan, Canada, that advocates for the profession of technicians and technologists within the provinces of their member organizations.

History
It was founded in 2010 as a partnership between associations of technology professions in British Columbia, Alberta, Saskatchewan, and Ontario.

The organization came about when several associations of certified engineering technology ceased their membership with the Canadian Council of Technicians and Technologists. The professional associations of Manitoba, New Brunswick, Nova Scotia, Prince Edward Island, and Newfoundland and Labrador remained in CCTT until 2021 when CCTT joined TPC.

Accreditation
TPC has created a new standard accreditation model, called Technology Accreditation Canada, based on a comprehensive review of current technology accreditation practices conducted by the Canadian Standards Association.

This accreditation model is being set up under a different organization, called Technology Accreditation Canada.

, the Canadian Technology Accreditation Board exists as a standing committee of CCTT. Established in 1982, it manages the accreditation of post-secondary applied science and engineering technology programs in Canada.

International Transferability of title
As TPC is not a signatory to the Dublin or Sydney accords, the transferability of title abroad is in question.

This is particularly true for graduates of programs whose accreditation is not recognized under the accords.

Membership
TPC consists of 4 of the 10 associations of certified engineering technicians and technologists in Canada.  These four Provincial Associations represent approximately 85% of the certified engineering technicians and technologists in Canada.

Membership consists of the Applied Science Technologists and Technicians of British Columbia, Association of Science and Engineering Technology Professionals of Alberta, Ontario Association of Certified Engineering Technicians and Technologists, and Saskatchewan Applied Science Technologists and Technicians.

References

External links
 

Professional associations based in Canada
Organizations based in Regina, Saskatchewan
Organizations established in 2010
Professional titles and certifications
Professional certification in engineering
2010 establishments in Saskatchewan